Oracle iPlanet Web Server (OiWS) is a web server designed for medium and large business applications. Previous versions were marketed as Netscape Enterprise Server, iPlanet Web Server, Sun ONE Web Server, and Sun Java System Web Server.

Oracle iPlanet Web Server is available on Solaris, Windows, HP-UX, AIX, Linux, supports JSP and Java Servlet technologies, PHP, NSAPI, CGI, and ColdFusion.

History
The Netscape Enterprise Server web server was developed originally by Netscape Communications Corporation in 1996, based on its 1994 release of Netsite. The product was renamed Sun Java System Web Server, reflecting the product's acquisition by Sun Microsystems, and then, when Oracle acquired Sun in 2010, to Oracle iPlanet Web Server.

In January 2009, Sun open sourced core components of Sun Java System Web Server 7.0 under the BSD license as Open Web Server. The open source version was kept in sync with commercial releases until January 2010 (7.0 update 8). Since Oracle's acquisition of Sun, there have been no further open source releases.

In 2010, Oracle renamed the product from Sun Java System Web Server to Oracle iPlanet Web Server, although documentation and links are still in the process of being updated to reflect this.

Release History 
 Oracle iPlanet Web Server 7.0.27 (released 2017-10)
 Oracle iPlanet Web Server 7.0.26 (released 2017-04)
 Oracle iPlanet Web Server 7.0.9.
 Sun Java System Web Server 7.0 Update 8. Last changes merged to open source
 Sun Java System Web Server 7.0 Update 7.
 Sun Java System Web Server 7.0 Update 6.
 Sun Java System Web Server 7.0 Update 5.
 Sun Java System Web Server 7.0 Update 4.
 Sun Java System Web Server 7.0 Update 3.
 Sun Java System Web Server 7.0 Update 2.
 Sun Java System Web Server 7.0 Update 1.
 Sun Java System Web Server 7.0.
 Oracle iPlanet Web Server 6.1 SP21.
 Oracle iPlanet Web Server 6.1 SP20.
 Oracle iPlanet Web Server 6.1 SP19.
 Oracle iPlanet Web Server 6.1 SP18.
 Oracle iPlanet Web Server 6.1 SP17.
 Oracle iPlanet Web Server 6.1 SP16.
 Oracle iPlanet Web Server 6.1 SP15.
 Oracle iPlanet Web Server 6.1 SP14.
 Sun Java System Web Server 6.1 SP13.
 Sun Java System Web Server 6.1 SP12.
 Sun Java System Web Server 6.1 SP11.
 Sun Java System Web Server 6.1 SP10.
 Sun Java System Web Server 6.1 SP9.
 Sun Java System Web Server 6.1 SP8.
 Sun Java System Web Server 6.1 SP7.
 Sun Java System Web Server 6.1 SP6.
 Sun Java System Web Server 6.1 SP5.
 Sun Java System Web Server 6.1 SP4.
 Sun ONE Web Server 6.1 SP3.
 Sun ONE Web Server 6.1 SP2.
 Sun ONE Web Server 6.1 SP1. Released September 6, 2002
 Sun ONE Web Server 6.1.
 Sun ONE Web Server 6.0 SP11.
 Sun ONE Web Server 6.0 SP3.
 iPlanet Web Server 6.0 SP2.
 iPlanet Web Server 6.0 SP1.
 iPlanet Web Server 6.0. Released November 19, 2001
 Sun ONE Web Server 4.1 SP15.
 Sun ONE Web Server 4.1 SP14.
 Sun ONE Web Server 4.1 SP10.
 iPlanet Web Server 4.1 SP9.
 iPlanet Web Server 4.1 SP6.
 iPlanet Web Server 4.1 SP3.
 iPlanet Web Server 4.1 SP2.
 iPlanet Web Server 4.1.
 iPlanet Web Server 4.0 SP6.
 iPlanet Web Server 4.0 SP5.
 iPlanet Web Server 4.0 SP4.
 iPlanet Web Server 4.0.1.
 iPlanet Web Server 4.0. Released September, 1999
 Netscape Enterprise Server 3.6 SP3.
 Netscape Enterprise Server 3.6 SP2.
 Netscape Enterprise Server 3.6 SP1.
 Netscape Enterprise Server 3.6. Released January 11, 1999
 Netscape Enterprise Server 3.5.1.
 Netscape Enterprise Server 3.5. Released February 1998
 Netscape Enterprise Server 3.0.1.
 Netscape Enterprise Server 3.0. Released June 1997
 Netscape Enterprise Server 2.0.1. Released November, 1996
 Netscape Enterprise Server 2.0. Released March 5, 1996
 Netsite 1.0. Release December 15, 1994

See also 
 Oracle Technology Network
 Oracle Fusion Middleware
 Oracle iPlanet Web Proxy Server
 Oracle HTTP Server
 Oracle WebLogic Server
 Oracle Application Server
 GlassFish
 Comparison of web server software
 Comparison of application servers

References

External links 
 
 Sun Java System Web Server product team wiki (most links are currently redirected to oracle's homepage, see the archived wiki for now)
 08/28/2010 Archived wiki
 Sun Java Web Server Delivers a Jolt review at ServerWatch
 Benchmarks comparing the performance of various web servers
 Sun Open Sources the Netscape Enterprise Server
 
 
 Article on heliod fork
 Netscape Enterprise Server Documentation, redhat.com
 Netscape Enterprise Server Documentation, netscape.com

Sun Microsystems software
Web server software
Web server software programmed in Java
Netscape